Colin Trevor Coates (born 1940) is a former English badminton international player and a former national champion.

Biography
Coates became the English National doubles champion after winning the inaugural English National Badminton Championships in 1964.

Coates represented Derbyshire and played 19 times for England and was also twice Irish Open champion in 1959 and 1961.

References 

English male badminton players
1940 births
Living people